Wynn House or Wynne House may refer to:

in the United States
(by state)
Wynne House (Fordyce, Arkansas), listed on the NRHP in Arkansas
Wynn-Price House, Garland, Arkansas, listed on the NRHP in Arkansas
Wynn House (Columbus, Georgia), listed on the NRHP in Georgia
Thomas Wynne House, Lilburn, Georgia, listed on the NRHP in Georgia
Wynne's Folly, Engelhard, North Carolina, listed on the NRHP in North Carolina
Heck-Lee, Heck-Wynne, and Heck-Pool Houses, Raleigh, North Carolina, listed on the NRHP in North Carolina
James Wynn House, Tazewell, Virginia, listed on the NRHP in Virginia